Sebastian Nachreiner (born 23 November 1988) is a German professional footballer who plays as a defender for SSV Jahn Regensburg in the 2. Bundesliga.

Nachreiner made his professional debut during the 2010–11 3. Liga season in a 2–1 away win over FC Carl Zeiss Jena.

Nachreiner was born in Gottfrieding. Outside football, he is working on this doctoral dissertation in legal theory about the rights and duties of referees.

References

External links 
 

1988 births
Living people
People from Dingolfing-Landau
Sportspeople from Lower Bavaria
German footballers
Footballers from Bavaria
Association football defenders
2. Bundesliga players
3. Liga players
Regionalliga players
SSV Jahn Regensburg players